Bradley Ruhaak (born September 17, 1994) is an American soccer player who plays as a defender.

References

External links
 

1994 births
Living people
Association football defenders
American soccer players
Akron Zips men's soccer players
Flint City Bucks players
North Carolina FC players
Cleveland SC players
Soccer players from Akron, Ohio
USL League Two players
North American Soccer League players